Pope Honorius III (r. 1216–1227) created nine cardinals in six consistories held throughout his pontificate.

December 1216
 Gil Torres
 Bertrando Savelli
 Niccolò

8 January 1219
 Konrad von Urach O.Cist.

October 1219
The sources conflict as to when this took place with some sources suggesting it could have been celebrated in November or December with others widening it in an October to December timeframe.
 Pietro Capuano

1219
 Niccolò de Chiaramonte O.Cist.

1221
 Leone
 Roberto Rainaldi

28 September 1225
 Oliver von Paderborn

Notes and references

College of Cardinals
Honorius III
Honorius
13th-century Catholicism
Pope Honorius III